Semorphone (Mr 2264) is an opiate analogue that is an N-substituted derivative of oxymorphone.

Semorphone is a partial agonist at μ-opioid receptors. It is around twice the potency of morphine, but with a ceiling effect on both analgesia and respiratory depression which means that these effects stop becoming any stronger after a certain maximum dose.

It is not currently used in medicine, and is not a controlled drug, although it might be considered to be a controlled substance analogue of oxymorphone on the grounds of its related chemical structure in some jurisdictions such as the United States, Canada, Australia and New Zealand.

References 

4,5-Epoxymorphinans
Opioids
Phenols
Tertiary alcohols
Ketones
Ethers
Mu-opioid receptor agonists